August Leonard Olsson (18 August 1878 – 14 August 1943) was a Swedish sailor who represented his native country at the 1908 Summer Olympics in Ryde, Isle of Wight, Great Britain in the 8 Metre.

Further reading

References 

1878 births
1943 deaths
Sportspeople from Stockholm
Sailors at the 1908 Summer Olympics – 8 Metre
Swedish male sailors (sport)
Olympic sailors of Sweden
20th-century Swedish people